Cold Water Music is the debut studio album by British musician Aim, released on 11 October 1999 by Grand Central Records. The album was re-issued in 2007 by ATIC Records.

Song information
The first track, "Intro", contains a sample from the documentary Hoop Dreams (1994) of William Gates, one of the basketball players followed in the film, speaking from his recovery room after surgery. The commentary forms the lyrics to the track. The track "Cold Water Music" contains a sample of "Maureen in the Desert", written by Carter Burwell and taken from the soundtrack to the film Psycho III (1986). The extended dialogue in the track "Demonique" was sampled from the John Carpenter horror films, Halloween (1978) and Halloween II (1981). It features (primarily) the exchanges between the characters of Dr. Sam Loomis (Donald Pleasence) and Sheriff Leigh Brackett (Charles Cyphers). The track "Ain't Got Time to Waste" is featured on the soundtrack of the European version of the video game Tony Hawk's Pro Skater. The track “Force” includes a sample of Spirit’s “Mr. Skin.”

Track listing

Personnel
Credits for Cold Water Music adapted from album liner notes.

 Aim – arrangement, production, scratching, sleeve design

Additional musicians
 A.G. – performance
 Q'n'C – performance
 Kate Rogers – performance
 Josef Ward – horns
 YZ – performance

Production
 Mike Ball – engineering (assistant)
 Steve Christian – engineering, mixing
 Nilesh Patel – mastering

Design
 Nick Fry – artwork, design
 Benge Newman – liner notes
 Tony Stone – photography
 Phil Turner – photography

Charts

References

1999 debut albums
Aim (musician) albums
Grand Central Records albums